Crepis occidentalis is a North American species of flowering plant in the family Asteraceae known by the common names western hawksbeard, or  largeflower hawksbeard. It is native to western Canada (British Columbia, Alberta, Saskatchewan) and the western United States (from the Pacific to the western Great Plains).

Crepis occidentalis grows in many types of habitat. It is a perennial herb growing a grayish woolly branching stem to about 40 centimeters (16 inches) in height from a deep taproot. The woolly, toothed leaves are up to 30 centimeters (12 inches) long at the base of the plant. The inflorescence produces several clusters of flower heads with hairy, often glandular phyllaries and many yellow ray florets but no disc florets. The fruit is a ribbed achene with a frilly pappus at the tip.

Subspecies
 Crepis occidentalis subsp. conjuncta Babcock & Stebbins – California, Colorado, Montana, Oregon, Washington, Wyoming
 Crepis occidentalis subsp. costata (A.Gray) Babc. & Stebbins – British Columbia, Saskatchewan, California, Colorado, Idaho, Montana, Nevada, Oregon, Utah, Washington, Wyoming
 Crepis occidentalis subsp. occidentalis – Alberta, British Columbia, Saskatchewan, Arizona, California, Colorado, Idaho, Montana, Oregon, New Mexico, Nevada, South Dakota, Utah, Washington., Wyoming
 Crepis occidentalis subsp. pumila (Rydb.) Babc. & Stebbins – British Columbia; California, Idaho, Montana, Nevada, Oregon, Utah, Washington

References

External links
Calflora Database: Crepis occidentalis (Largeflower hawksbeard)
 Jepson Manual eFlora (TJM2) treatment of  Crepis occidentalis
USDA Plants Profile for Crepis occidentalis (largeflower hawksbeard)
UC Calphotos gallery of Crepis occidentalis

occidentalis
Flora of Western Canada
Flora of the Western United States
Flora of California
Flora of the Great Basin
Flora of the Sierra Nevada (United States)
Plants described in 1834
Taxa named by Thomas Nuttall
Flora without expected TNC conservation status